Veres Pálné Secondary Grammar School (VPG) is a prestigious Hungarian public grammar school based in Budapest. The school was founded by Pálné Veres in 1869 and it became the first institution in Hungary to admit women. Throughout the years the school has been considered one of the strongest secondary schools in Hungary. Its library boasts more than 30,000 books, many of which have significant historical importance.

References 

Secondary schools in Hungary
1869 establishments in Austria-Hungary
Schools in Budapest